Pandoraviridae is a family of double-stranded DNA viruses that infect amoebae. There is only one genus in this family: Pandoravirus. Several species in this genus have been described, including Pandoravirus dulcis, Pandoravirus salinus and Pandoravirus yedoma.

History
The viruses were discovered in 2013.

Description
The viruses in this family are the second largest known virus (~1 micrometer) in capsid length, after Pithovirus (1.5 micrometer).  Pandoravirus has the largest viral genome known, containing double-stranded DNA of 1.9 to 2.5 megabase pairs.

Evolution
These viruses appear to be related to the phycodnaviruses.

References

Nucleocytoplasmic large DNA viruses
Unaccepted virus taxa